is a passenger railway station located in the city of Takamatsu, Kagawa Prefecture, Japan. It is operated by JR Shikoku and has the station number "Y01".

Lines
The station is served by the JR Shikoku Yosan Line and is located 3.4 km from the beginning of the line at Takamatsu. Only the local service on the Yosan Line stop at the station. These trains also stop at Kōzai.

Layout
Kōzai Station consists of two staggered side platforms serving two tracks. There is no station building but each platform has a shelter and ticket vending machines. From the access road, separate ramps lead up to each platform. A designated area for the parking of bicycles is provided near the station.

History
Japanese National Railways (JNR) opened Kōzai Station on 27 January 1952 as an added station on the existing Yosan Line.  With the privatization of JNR on 1 April 1987, control of the station passed to JR Shikoku.

Surrounding area
Kagawa Prefectural Police Headquarters Driver's License Center
Takamatsu City Katsuga Junior High School

See also
 List of railway stations in Japan

References

External links

Station timetable

Railway stations in Japan opened in 1952
Railway stations in Takamatsu